The Solomon Islands women's national under-17 football team is the second highest women's youth team of women's football in the Solomon Islands and is controlled by the Solomon Islands Football Federation.

History
The Solomon Islands participated one time so far in the OFC U-17 Women's Championship. This was in 2010 and it was the first time that the tournament was held. This tournament was a big success for the Solomon Islands as they managed to reach a second place after victory's against Tonga (5-0) and Papua New Guinea (1-0). In the end they lost against New Zealand (10-0). In 2016 they had the intention of participating for the second time in the tournament. However due to a financial crisis within the Football Federation there wasn't enough money, which meant that the team had to withdraw.

OFC
The OFC Women's Under 17 Qualifying Tournament is a tournament held once every two years to decide the only qualification spot for Oceania Football Confederation (OFC) and representatives at the FIFA U-17 World Cup.

References

External links
Solomon Islands Football Federation page
Oceania Football Federation page

Women's national under-17 association football teams
women's